Jacob William Hutson (born 22 June 1994) is an English cricketer. He made his first-class debut for Sussex against South Africa A on 14 June 2017.

References

External links
 

1994 births
Living people
English cricketers
Sussex cricketers
People from Sidcup